The Barracuda class (or Suffren class) is a nuclear attack submarine, designed by the French shipbuilder Naval Group (formerly known as DCNS and DCN) for the French Navy. It is intended to replace the s. Construction began in 2007 and the first unit was commissioned on 6 November 2020. The lead boat of the class, entered service on 3 June 2022.

History

Development  
In October 1998, the Delegation Générale pour l'Armement, the French government's defense procurement agency, established an integrated project team consisting of the Naval Staff, DCN (now known as Naval Group), Technicatome and the Commissariat a l'Énergie Atomique, a regulatory body that oversees nuclear power plants, to oversee the design of a new attack submarine class. DCN was to be the boat's designer and builder while Technicatome (since acquired by Areva) was to be responsible for the nuclear power plant. The two companies were to act jointly as a single prime contractor to share the industrial risks, manage the schedules, and be responsible for the design's performance and costs, which at the time was estimated to be US$4.9 billion.

On 22 December 2006, the French government placed a €7.9 billion order for six Barracuda submarines with Naval Group and their nuclear power plants with Areva-Technicatome. According to the DGA “Competition at the subcontractor level will be open to foreign companies for the first time.” According to the contract, the first boat was to commence sea trials in early 2016, with delivery occurring in late 2016/early 2017. This was to be followed by entry into service in late 2017. However, this timetable for service entry was later pushed back into the early 2020s.

Conventionally-powered variants 
DCNS/Naval Group has also put forward diesel-electric variants of the Barracuda, for several other navies.

One conventionally-powered concept, dubbed the SMX-Ocean, features fuel cells and vertical launchers. This variant has been offered to the Indian Navy.

In 2016, another variant, known within Naval Group as the Shortfin Barracuda – with a diesel-electric powerplant and scaled-down missile capabilities – was offered to both the Royal Australian Navy (RAN) and Royal Canadian Navy (RCN). That same year, the Shortfin Barracuda was selected by the Australian government, for a major expansion of the RAN submarine fleet during the 2030s. A total of 12 vessels were to enter service with the RAN from 2032, augmenting and replacing six  vessels. However, in mid-September 2021, the Australian government decided the RAN will instead acquire a nuclear-powered submarine design of British and American lineage, thus effectively cancelling the Barracuda contract.

Naval Group is also offering a subvariant of the Shortfin diesel-electric design, as a replacement for the current  submarines of the Royal Netherlands Navy, competing against the A26 design put forward by Saab and Damen.

Description

This class reportedly produces approximately 1/1000 of the detectable noise of the  boats, and they are ten times more sensitive in detecting other submarines. They will be fitted with torpedo-tube-launched MdCN cruise missiles for long-range (well above ) strikes against strategic land targets. Their missions will include anti-surface and anti-submarine warfare, land attack, intelligence gathering, crisis management and special operations.

The Barracuda class nuclear reactor incorporates several improvements over that of the preceding Rubis. Notably, it extends the time between refueling and complex overhauls (RCOHs) from 7 to 10 years, enabling higher at-sea availability.

In support of special operations missions, Barracudas may also accommodate up to 15 commandos, while carrying their equipment in a mobile pod attached aft of the sail.

Specifications

Designed by Naval Group and TechnicAtome, this class has the following capabilities:

 SYCOBS combat system with :

 Thales PARTNER communication system with :
 Thales DIVESAT communications mast with SYRACUSE satellite link. 
 L11, L22 and L16 data-links
 Thales TUUM-5 Mk2 underwater telephone and emergency beacon
 NEMESIS countermeasure system (based on CONTRALTO) from Naval Group which applies a "confusion / dilution" principle and combines evasive maneuvers with the deployment of Canto-S decoys.
 Nuclear-electric propulsion (NEP) where the screw is turned by an electric motor and not a steam turbine with reduction gearing like most other submarines. This is quieter and allows integration of batteries to further quieting.
 TechnicAtome K15 150 MW reactor.
 2x 10MW turbo-generator groups.
 Large batteries that allow the submarine to run at minimum reactor power for several days in near perfect quiet.
 2x SEMPT Pielstick 480 kW each emergency diesel generators.
 Large endurance :
 Ten years of nuclear fuel.
 70 days of food.
 Removable dry dock for PSM3G six-seat special-forces submarine and room.

Boats
Italics indicate projected dates

Shortfin Barracuda conventional variant

Naval Group submitted a conventionally powered diesel-electric variation to the design – named the Shortfin Barracuda Block 1A, a derivative of the SMX Ocean concept – to the competitive evaluation process (CEP) phase of Australia's Collins-class submarine replacement. Naval Group was chosen by the Australian Government on 26 April 2016 to build twelve of the Shortfin Barracuda Block 1A variant at a projected AU$50 billion (US$). Much of the works were to be undertaken at ASC Pty Ltd in Adelaide, South Australia. Construction was expected to begin in 2023.

On 16 September 2021, Australia cancelled the Attack-class project and entered into a partnership with the United States and United Kingdom to obtain nuclear submarine technology. The reactors run on weapons-grade uranium, are sealed and last for the thirty three years. The ones France uses, on the other hand, have to be serviced every ten years since it switched from weapons-grade to low-enriched uranium (LEU) to fuel its nuclear powered submarines from the  onward; this therefore requires a domestic nuclear industry, which Australia lacks.

The Shortfin Barracuda class is the submarine that Naval Group is proposing to the Royal Netherlands navy and is one of the 3 competitors in the Walrus-class submarine replacement  program for the Dutch Navy, the design is competing with the Saab A26 submarine and the TKMS Type 212 submarine

See also
 List of submarines of France
 Submarine forces (France)
 Future of the French Navy
 Cruise missile submarine

References

External links

France's Future SSNs: The Barracuda Class at Defense Industry Daily.

Submarine classes
 
Proposed ships
Attack submarines